Lawson Wood, sometimes Clarence Lawson Wood , (23 August 1878 – 26 October 1957), was an English painter, illustrator and designer.

Biography

Lawson Wood was born on 23 August 1878 in Highgate, London, the son of landscape artist Pinhorn Wood  (1848–1918), and the grandson of architectural artist L.J. Wood ,  (18131901). He studied at the Slade School of Fine Art, at the Heatherley School of Fine Art, and took evening classes at Frank Calderon's School of Animal Painting.

In 1896, at age 18, he was employed with periodical publisher C. Arthur Pearson. He soon became Pearson's chief artist, leaving after six years to turn freelance.

In 1902, he married the fashion artist Charlotte Forge. The couple had two sons and one daughter.

Work
From the age of 24 he pursued a successful freelance career and was published in  The Graphic, The Strand Magazine, Punch, The Illustrated London News, and the Boys Own Paper. He illustrated a number of books including Louis Tracy's The Invaders in 1901 for Pearson.

His books include The Bow-Wow Book (1912), Rummy Tales (1920), The Noo-Zoo Tales (1922), Jolly Rhymes (1926), Fun Fair (1931), The Old Nursery Rhymes (1933), The Bedtime Picture Book (1943), Meddlesome Monkeys (1946) and Mischief Makers (1946). Frederick Warne of London a seried of Mr. books by Wood in 1916:Mr Prickles, Mr Quack, Mr Trunk, Mr Grunt, Mr Fox, and Mr Pup.

Assessment
Peppin and Micklethwait stated that Wood's wide reputation as a humorous illustrator and commercial artist was based in part on astute management. He retained the copyright in his work and licensed it in Britain and abroad for posters, postcards, etc. Cran'pop was merchandised in pottery, calendars, postcards, and cigarette cards. Wood worked in pen and ink, pencils, chalk, and watercolour. He used a specially made enamel palette about one foot (300mm) square and worked on Milburn Drawing Board at an architects desk.

Houfe said that most of Wood's work was "humorous in drawing and content, his repertoire of characters including peppery army officers, namby-pamby men and dominating old dames. The figures are heavily caricatured and he was one of the group of artists who made capital 
out of imaginary prehistoric scenes." Kelly calls a watercolour by Wood "a welcome holiday from the prehistoric monsters and chimpanzees on which he wasted so much talent." Peppin and Micklethwait cite Percy Bradshaw as saying the Wood had a "breadth, ease and fluency which many an infinitely more serious artist must envy".

Later life
Wood lived in a 15th-century medieval manor house he moved brick by brick from Sussex to the Kent border. He died in Devon on 26 October 1957 at the age of 79.

Notes

References

External links

 Lawson Wood on Artnet
 Lawson Wood artworks
 

1878 births
1957 deaths
19th-century English painters
English male painters
20th-century English painters
English watercolourists
English illustrators
The New Yorker cartoonists
People from Highgate
Royal Flying Corps officers
20th-century English male artists
19th-century English male artists